In physics, dephasing is a mechanism that recovers classical behaviour from a quantum system. It refers to the ways in which coherence caused by perturbation decays over time, and the system returns to the state before perturbation. It is an important effect in molecular and atomic spectroscopy, and in the condensed matter physics of mesoscopic devices.

The reason can be understood by describing the conduction in metals as a classical phenomenon with quantum effects all embedded into an effective mass that can be computed quantum mechanically, as also happens to resistance that can be seen as a scattering effect of conduction electrons. When the temperature is lowered and the dimensions of the device are meaningfully reduced, this classical behaviour should disappear and the laws of quantum mechanics should govern the behavior of conducting electrons seen as waves that move ballistically inside the conductor without any kind of dissipation. Most of the time this is what one observes. But it appeared as a surprise to uncover that the so-called dephasing time, that is the time it takes for the conducting electrons to lose their quantum behavior, becomes finite rather than infinite when the temperature approaches zero in mesoscopic devices violating the expectations of the theory of Boris Altshuler, Arkady Aronov and David E. Khmelnitskii. This kind of saturation of the dephasing time at low temperatures is an open problem even as several proposals have been put forward.

The coherence of a sample is explained by the off-diagonal elements of a density matrix. An external electric or magnetic field can create coherences between two quantum states in a sample if the frequency corresponds to the energy gap between the two states. The coherence terms decay with the dephasing time or spin–spin relaxation, T2.

After coherence is created in a sample by light, the sample emits a polarization wave, the frequency of which is equal to and the phase of which is inverted from the incident light. In addition, the sample is excited by the incident light and a population of molecules in the excited state is generated. The light passing through the sample is absorbed because of these two processes, and it is expressed by an absorption spectrum. The coherence decays with the time constant, T2, and the intensity of the polarization wave is reduced. The population of the excited state also decays with the time constant of the longitudinal relaxation, T1. The time constant T2 is usually much smaller than T1, and the bandwidth of the absorption spectrum is related to these time constants by the Fourier transform, so the time constant T2 is a main contributor to the bandwidth. The time constant T2 has been measured with ultrafast time-resolved spectroscopy directly, such as in photon echo experiments.

What is the dephasing rate of a particle that has an energy E if it is subject to a fluctuating environment that has a temperature T? In particular what is the dephasing rate close to equilibrium (E~T), and what happens in the zero temperature limit? This question has fascinated the mesoscopic community during the last two decades (see references below).

See also
Dephasing rate SP formula

References

Other 

 (And references therein.)

Wave mechanics
Quantum optics
Quantum information science
Mesoscopic physics